Edneyville is an unincorporated community and census-designated place (CDP) in Henderson County, North Carolina, United States. Its population was 2,367 as of the 2010 census.

A post office called Edneyville has been in operation since 1828. Rev. Samuel Edney served as postmaster. He and his brother Asa were the two earliest settlers in the area. Samuel had 12 children and Asa had eight. Their descendants settled in the neighboring area, which led to the name Edneyville.

Since 1998 Edneyville is home of the North Carolina Justice Academy, a division of the North Carolina Department of Justice. The institution is currently located on the grounds and facilities of the former Edneyville High School.

Geography
The Eastern Continental Divide runs through the center of the CDP; the eastern side of the community drains via Reedypatch Creek to the Broad River, which flows through the Congaree and Santee River systems to the Atlantic Ocean, while the western side of the community drains to Clear Creek, which flows via Mud Creek to the French Broad River, then the Tennessee River, and finally the Mississippi River to the Gulf of Mexico.

U.S. Route 64 passes through Edneyville, leading southwest  to Hendersonville and northeast  to Bat Cave.

Demographics

Notes

Census-designated places in North Carolina
Census-designated places in Henderson County, North Carolina
Unincorporated communities in North Carolina
Unincorporated communities in Henderson County, North Carolina